The 1976 Monterrey WCT was a men's tennis tournament played on indoor carpet courts in Monterrey, Mexico. The event was part of the 1976 World Championship Tennis circuit. It was the inaugural edition of the tournament and was held from January 6 to 11, 1976. Fourth-seeded Eddie Dibbs won the singles title.

Finals

Singles
 Eddie Dibbs defeated  Harold Solomon, 7–6, 6–2
 It was Dibbs' 1st singles title of the year and the 7th of his career.

Doubles
 Brian Gottfried /  Raúl Ramírez defeated  Ross Case /  Geoff Masters, 6–2, 4–6, 6–3

See also
 1976 Mexico City WCT

References

External links
 ITF tournament edition details

Monterrey
1976 in Mexican tennis
Monterrey WCT